István Kniezsa (1 December 1898, Trsztena, Austria-Hungary, now Trstená, Slovakia – 15 March 1965, Budapest, Hungary) was a Hungarian linguist and Slavist. His major contribution was to the research of Slavic loanwords in the Hungarian language and toponymy.

Selected works

A magyar helyesírás a tatárjárásig. Budapest, Magyar Nyelvtudományi Társaság, 1928, 32 p.
A szlávok. Budapest, 1932. = Kincsestár, 26.
Pseudorumänen in Pannonien und in den Nordkarpathen. Budapest, 1936. = Ostmitteleuropäische Bibliothek, 2.
Magyarország népei a XI. században. in: Emlékkönyv Szent István király halálának 900. évfordulóján. Budapest, Franklin, 1938, 368–472.
Cirillbetűs szláv szövegek nemzetközi tudományos átírása. Budapest, Országos Széchényi Könyvtár, 1939, 14 p.
Az esztergomi káptalan 1156-i dézsmajegyzékének helységei. Századok 1939, 167-187.
Adalékok a magyar–szlovák nyelvhatár történetéhez. Budapest, Athenaeum, 1941, 62 p.
Erdély víznevei. 1942.
Az Ecsedi-láp környékének szláv eredetű helynevei. Debrecen, 1943, 42 p.
Nyelvészet és őstörténet. in: A magyarság őstörténete. Szerk. Ligeti Lajos. Budapest, 1943.
Keletmagyarország helynevei. in: Magyarok és románok I–II. Szerk. Deér József & Gáldi László. Budapest, Athenaeum, 1943, 111–313.
A párhuzamos helynévadás: Egy fejezet a településtörténet módszertanából. Budapest, Magyar Történettudományi Intézet, 1944, 59 p.
A zobori apátság 1111. és 1113. évi oklevelei, mint nyelvi (nyelvjárási) emlékek. Debrecen, Debreceni Tudományegyetem, 1949, 52 p.
A magyar helyesírás története. Budapest, Tankönyvkiadó, 1952, 29 p.
Helyesírásunk története a könyvnyomtatás koráig. Budapest, Akadémiai, 1952, 204 p. = Nyelvészeti Tanulmányok.
A magyar nyelv szláv jövevényszavai I/1–2. Budapest, Akadémiai, 1955.
A magyar állami és jogi terminológia eredete. in: MTA Nyelv- és Irodalomtudományi Osztályának Közleményei 1955. 237–266.
A magyar szlavisztika problémái és feladatai. in: MTA Nyelv- és Irodalomtudományi Osztályának Közleményei 1958. 69–124.
A magyar és szlovák családnevek rendszere. Budapest, ELTE, 1965, 112 p.
Az -i helynévképző a magyarban.
Párhuzamos helynévadás.

References

Bibliography 
Hadrovics László: Kniezsa István. in: Magyar Tudomány 1965.
Kiss Lajos: Kniezsa István 1898–1965. in: Magyar Nyelvőr 1965.
Kiss Lajos: Kniezsa István. Budapest, 1994.
Kniezsa-hagyaték

1898 births
1965 deaths
Hungarian academics
Slavists
Linguists from Hungary
People from Trstená
20th-century linguists